The Viewer's Choice Award for Lifestyle Host is a Gemini Award.

2006 finalists
 Winner: Marilyn Denis, CityLine
 Jeff Douglas, Things That Move
 Mike Holmes, Holmes on Homes
 George Stroumboulopoulos, CBC News: The Hour
 Debbie Travis, Debbie Travis' Facelift

Shortlist
 Theresa Albert-Rachford, Just One Bite
 Jeanne Beker, Fashion Television
 Karen Bertelsen, Designer Superstar Challenge and Handyman Superstar Challenge
 Bob Blumer, The Surreal Gourmet and Thirst for Life
 Kevin Brauch, Superstar Chef Challenge and The Thirsty Traveler
 Kimberly Carroll, Take This House & Sell It!
 Andrika Lawren and Emmanuel Belliveau, My Parents' House
 Anna Olson, Sugar and Kitchen Equipped
 Candice Olson, Divine Design with Candice Olson
 Valerie Pringle, Valerie Pringle Has Left The Building
 Dina Pugliese, Muchmusic VJ Search: The Series
 Jay Purvis, Kitchen Equipped
 Lynda Reeves, House & Home with Lynda Reeves
 Sandi Richard, Fixing Dinner
 Sarah Richardson, Design Inc.
 Rebecca Rosenblat, Between the Sheets
 Wayne Rostad, On the Road Again
 Reg Sherrin, Country Canada
 Michael Smith, Chef at Home and Chef At Large
 Evan Solomon, Hot Type and CBC News: Sunday
 Mercedes Stephenson, The Underground Royal Commission Investigates
 Steve Paikin and Paula Todd, Studio 2
 Kristina Matisic & Anna Wallner, The Shopping Bags
 Scott Thompson, My Fabulous Gay Wedding
 Gail Vaz-Oxlade, Til Debt Do Us Part
 Andrew Younghusband, Canada's Worst Handyman and Canada's Worst Driver

See also

 Canadian television awards

References

Gemini Awards